Komaj Khor (also Romanized as Komāj Khor; also known as Komāch Khor and Komājkhor) is a village in Qara Bashlu Rural District, Chapeshlu District, Dargaz County, Razavi Khorasan Province, Iran. At the 2006 census, its population was 219, in 61 families.

References 

Populated places in Dargaz County